Chubenko is a Ukrainian surname. Notable people with the surname include:

 Oleksiy Chubenko (1889–?), Ukrainian anarchist
 Stepan Chubenko (1997–2014), Ukrainian football player

See also
 

Ukrainian-language surnames